Süreyya Aylin Antmen (born 1981 in Istanbul, Turkey) is a contemporary Turkish poet, essayist, writer and editor.

Biography
Süreyya Aylin Antmen was born in 1981 in Istanbul. She is a Turkish writer and poet. She wrote her first poem when she was 13 years old. She studied Sociology and Philosophy in Anadolu University. She has published poetry and prose. Antmen’s first published poem appeared in Patika Poetry Review in 2004. Her poems and articles were published in several literary journals like Şiir Ülkesi, Damar, Öteki-siz, NO Edebiyat, Varlık, Cumhuriyet Kitap, Papirüs Güncel, Yeni E and Özgür Edebiyat. In 2008 her work Sonsuzluğa Kiracı was found “remarkable” at the Yaşar Nabi Nayır Youth Awards. Her poems have been translated into English, Zaza, Urdu, Kurdish and French.

Books
 Sonsuzluğa Kiracı (Tenant to Eternity) May 2011. Şiirden Books.  (The second edition, October, 2016. Ve Publishing House. )
 Geceyle Bir  October, 2016. Ve Publishing House. 
 Ateş Sözcükleri"  September, 2018. Ve Publishing House. 
Bırakma Dersleri February, 2021. Ve Publishing House. ISBN 9786059626323

Other
 Turkish Poetry Today 2017, Red Hand Books, 2017. (England)
 Mantis Journal, Stanford University Press, 2019. (USA)

Awards
 2008 Yaşar Nabi Nayır Youth Awards: "Remarkable" for Sonsuzluğa Kiracı

External links
 Personal website
 Poem: Far Seas’ Pearl / Mediterranean.nu
  A published article on Sonsuzluğa Kiracı
 Translated poems
  Interview with Süreyya Aylin Antmen 22.10.2016 DuvaR
  Interview with Süreyya Aylin Antmen 04.12.2016 BirGün Newspaper
Interview with Süreyya Aylin Antmen, Yeni E Poetry Magazine, April 2019.
Interview with Süreyya Aylin Antmen, Evrensel Newspaper, November 2018. 
Interview with Süreyya Aylin Antmen on Poetry and Creativity. December 2018
Interview with Süreyya Aylin Antmen on New Poetry Book. Duvar Newspaper, 2021.

References

1981 births
Turkish poets
Living people
Turkish women writers